Brian McCutcheon may refer to:

Brian McCutcheon (politician), Progressive Conservative Party candidate in the 1997 Canadian federal election
Brian McCutcheon (ice hockey) (born 1949), Canadian professional ice hockey player